Irina Krakoviak-Tolstika (born 16 November 1977) is a former track and field middle distance runner who competed internationally for Lithuania.

In the 2000 Olympics she made her Olympic debut, where in 1500 metres distance she reached semi-final.
In 2009, she competed in World Championships 1500 metres distance, where she reached semifinal running. in 800 metres distance she failed to reach semi final.

Personal records 
Outdoor
800 m – 2:00.71 (2009) 
1000 m - 2:40.48 (2005)
1500 m - 4:03.19 (2005)
Indoor
800 m - 2:03.77 (2000)
1000 m - 2:38.77 (2006)
1500 m - 4:10.74 (2006)

References

1977 births
Living people
Lithuanian female middle-distance runners
Olympic athletes of Lithuania
Athletes (track and field) at the 2000 Summer Olympics